ARFC may refer to:

In association football (soccer):

Adamstown Rosebuds FC
Albert Rovers F.C.
Albion Rovers F.C.
Albion Rovers F.C. (Newport)
Ards Rangers F.C.
Arniston Rangers F.C.
Athersley Recreation F.C.

In rugby union:

Aberavon RFC
Abercarn RFC
Abercrave RFC
Abercynon RFC
Aberdare RFC
Abergavenny RFC
Abertillery RFC
Aberystwyth RFC
Alnwick RFC
Ammanford RFC
Annan RFC
Antrim RFC
Ardee RFC
Ards RFC
Arklow RFC
Army Rugby Football Club
Ashbourne RFC
Athboy RFC
Ayr RFC